Aljaž may refer to
Aljaž (name)
Aljaž Lodge in the Vrata Valley, a mountain hut in Slovenia
Aljaž Tower in Slovenia